Neil Gibson may refer to:

Sports
 Neilly Gibson (born 1873), Scottish footballer
 Neil Gibson (footballer, born 1899), Scottish footballer
 Neil Gibson (footballer, born 1979), Welsh footballer and manager
 Neil Gibson (rower) (born 1962), New Zealand representative rower
 Neil Gibson (tennis), Australian tennis player of the 1950s and 60s

Others
 Neil Gibson, a fictional character in The Problem of Thor Bridge, a Sherlock Holmes story by Arthur Conan Doyle
 Neil Gibson, a television presenter on the Globe Trekker travel series